Knappett is a surname. Notable people with the surname include:

Jessica Knappett (born 1984), British comedy writer and actress
Josh Knappett (born 1985), English cricketer